The Martha L. Black-class icebreakers are a class of six light icebreaker and buoy tenders constructed for and operated by the Canadian Coast Guard. Built in the 1980s, the class operates on both coasts of Canada and have been used for operations in the Arctic region, including the search for the ships of Franklin's lost expedition. They are rated as "high endurance multi-tasked vessels" under Canadian Coast Guard naming rules.

Design and description

The vessels are propelled by two fixed pitch propellers and bow thrusters powered by three Alco 251F diesel-electric engines creating  and three Canadian GE generators producing 6 megawatts of AC power driving two Canadian GE motors creating . The ships are also equipped with one Caterpillar 3306 emergency generator. The range of the vessels, based on speed and fuel capacity, is varied. The ships are certified as Arctic Class 2.

The icebreakers are equipped with one Racal Decca Bridgemaster navigational radar operating on the I band. Sir William Alexander and Edward Cornwallis have one less deck in the superstructure. The ships are equipped with a flight deck and a hangar which originally housed light helicopters of the MBB Bo 105 or Bell 206L types, but in the 2010s, the Bell 429 GlobalRanger and Bell 412EPI were acquired by the Canadian Coast Guard to replace the older helicopters. Some vessels carry a self-propelled barge. Ship's complements range from 25–27, with 10 officers and 15–17 crew. Additional berths range from 9 to 26 additional berths.

Ships in class

Operational history
The ships in the class all entered service in 1986–1987. The Canadian Coast Guard classifies all the ships in the class as "high endurance multi-tasked vessels" within their classification system. Martha L. Black and George R. Pearkes were assigned to the Western Region, based at Victoria, British Columbia. Sir Wilfrid Laurier was initially assigned to the Laurentian Region, home ported at Quebec City, Quebec. Ann Harvey was assigned to Newfoundland Region, based at St. John's, Newfoundland and Labrador and Edward Cornwallis and Sir William Alexander were assigned to the Maritimes Region, based at Dartmouth, Nova Scotia. Martha L. Black and Sir Wilfrid Laurier swapped places, while George R. Pearkes was reassigned first to Quebec City then to St. John's in 2004.

The vessels are used for buoy placement, retrieval and monitoring, scientific research, construction programs, search and rescue, icebreaking, and pollution control. They have been deployed on special missions, such as the 2005 operation to Louisiana by Sir William Alexander as part of Canada's aid to the United States following the devastation wrought by Hurricane Katrina. Erebus was found during the search.

On 17 December 2007, Edward Cornwallis was dispatched to recover the  barge Houston carrying diesel fuel that had cast adrift in St. George's Bay near Port Hood, Nova Scotia. Facing  winds and  waves, members of the crew boarded the barge. They rescued the crew and kept the barge from going aground until a tugboat arrived on 19 December. Five members of the crew were later awarded medals for their efforts. Sir William Alexander was involved in a fatal towing incident involving the fishing vessel  during the 2008 Canadian commercial seal hunt.

The ship had been performing work on buoys when she hit bottom. A hole was torn in the hull and as she pulled back off the rocks, water flooded the motor propulsion room. The ship lost power and was towed to Connaigre Bay where temporary repairs were made. Ann Harvey was then towed to St. John's to undergo further repairs and refit. In March 2016, Canadian Coast Guard trials with the Schiebel Camcopter S-100 took place aboard George R. Pearkes off the Atlantic coast of Canada.

In 2021, due to the controversial history of Edward Cornwalliss initial namesake, Lieutenant General Edward Cornwallis, a British Army officer and founding governor of Halifax, Nova Scotia, the ship was renamed Kopit Hopson 1752 in consultation with indigenous peoples, to commemorate Jean-Baptiste Cope under his Mi'kmaq name, British Governor Peregrine Hopson, and the year of the peace and friendship treaty created by former Governor Edward Cornwallis.

References

Citations

Sources
 
 
 

~